"Morning" is a song by American singer-songwriters Teyana Taylor and Kehlani. It was released on November 1, 2019 with a music video directed by Taylor. It is the second track after "How You Want It?" on Taylor's third album titled The Album.

Charts

Certifications

References

2019 singles
Teyana Taylor songs
Kehlani songs
Female vocal duets